Esther Newton (born 1940, New York City) is an American cultural anthropologist who did pioneering work on the ethnography of lesbian and gay communities in the United States.

Career
Newton studied history at the University of Michigan and received her BA with distinction in 1962 before starting graduate work in anthropology at the University of Chicago under David M. Schneider.

Her PhD dissertation, "The drag queens; a study in urban anthropology" (1968), examined the experiences, social interactions, and culture of drag queens, or (mostly gay-identified) men who dressed and performed as women in various kinds of theatrical settings or as an expression/performance of their sexual identity. Later published in several articles and as Mother camp: female impersonators in America (1972), Newton's work represented the first major anthropological study of a homosexual community in the United States, and laid some of the groundwork for theorists such as Judith Butler, who would later explore the performative dimensions of sex and gender roles.

Her second book, Cherry Grove, Fire Island: Sixty years in America's first gay and lesbian town (1993), used oral history and ethnographic methods to document the changing dynamics of Cherry Grove, a beach resort on Fire Island, New York, and one of the oldest and most visible predominantly lesbian and gay male communities in the United States.

Newton is currently Professor Emerita of Anthropology and Kempner Distinguished Research Professor at Purchase College, State University of New York. She is also a lecturer in Women's Studies and American Culture at the University of Michigan in Ann Arbor, Michigan.

Personal life

Newton identifies as lesbian. She is in a long-term relationship with lesbian-feminist performance artist Holly Hughes. They married in 2015.

Newton is the daughter of psychotherapist Saul B. Newton.

Awards
 1994: Ruth Benedict Prize for Cherry Grove, Fire Island: Sixty Years in America's First Gay and Lesbian Town (1993).
 1995: David R. Kessler Award for LGBTQ Studies, CLAGS: The Center for LGBTQ Studies
 2000: Ruth Benedict Prize for Margaret Mead Made Me Gay: Personal Essays, Public Ideas (2000).

Bibliography
 
 
  (co-editor)
  (co-authored with Shirley Walton)
 
 
 
 
 
  (Lesbian History project, University of Michigan)

References

External links
 
 Esther Newton faculty profile, State University of New York at Purchase

1940 births
American anthropologists
American women anthropologists
Lesbian academics
American lesbian writers
LGBT anthropologists
University of Michigan alumni
Living people
21st-century American women writers